Iain Canning is an English film and television producer best known for producing the film The King's Speech (2010), for which he won an Academy Award for Best Picture and the BAFTA award for Best Film and Best British Film, and for executive producing television series Top of the Lake, which was nominated for an Emmy, BAFTA and Golden Globe award.  He has been nominated for 3 Academy Awards and won 1, nominated for 5 BAFTAs and won 3, and nominated for 2 Emmy Awards and won 1. 

Iain co-founded See-Saw Films with producing partner Emile Sherman in 2008. Their offices are based in London, UK and Sydney, Australia.

Career

Iain Canning co-founded See-Saw Films with Emile Sherman in 2008 and has produced several major films including Lion, winner of two BAFTA Awards, starring Dev Patel, Nicole Kidman and Rooney Mara, and The Power of the Dog, starring Benedict Cumberbatch, Kodi Smit-McPhee, Kirsten Dunst and Jesse Plemons. Canning produced Jane Campion's Emmy Award-nominated TV series Top of the Lake. The second series, Top of the Lake: China Girl, also directed by Campion, premiered at the Cannes Film Festival 2017. Elisabeth Moss reprised her Golden Globe-winning role as Detective Robin Griffin, which also starred Nicole Kidman and Gwendoline Christie.

Canning won an Academy Award in 2011 for The King's Speech directed by Tom Hooper. The film stars Colin Firth, Geoffrey Rush and Helena Bonham Carter

In 2019, Canning produced short-form British comedy series, State of the Union, which premiered on Sundance TV. The first season starred Rosamund Pike and Chris O'Dowd and won three Emmy Awards including Outstanding Short Form Comedy or Drama Series. In 2021, the series was renewed for a second season starring Brendan Gleeson and Patricia Clarkson.

Also in  2019, Canning and Sherman teamed up with Garth Davis to form a new production company called I AM THAT, with Samantha Lang as head of development.

2021 saw the releases of British TV series The North Water, written and directed by Andrew Haigh, starring Jack O'Connell and Colin Farrell, and Australian TV series Firebite, written by Warwick Thornton and Brendan Fletcher and directed by Thornton, Fletcher and Tony Krawitz. Both series premiered on AMC+ in the United States.

In November 2021, Netflix released The Power of the Dog, which is See-Saw's second collaboration with Jane Campion. In 2022, the film won 2 BAFTAs including Best Film, and was nominated for 12 Academy Awards, with Jane Campion going on to win Best Director. The film originally premiered at the 78th Venice International Film Festival and Campion was awarded the Silver Lion for Best Director.

See-Saw's latest TV projects to release in 2022 include Slow Horses and The Essex Serpent for Apple TV+, and Heartstopper for Netflix. Upcoming films include Operation Mincemeat, which stars Colin Firth, Matthew Macfadyen, Kelly Macdonald, Penelope Winton and Johnny Flynn; The Stranger, which stars Sean Harris and Joel Edgerton; and Florian Zeller's The Son, which stars Hugh Jackman, Laura Dern, Vanessa Kirby and Zen McGrath.

Prior to founding See-Saw, Canning executive-produced the award-winning films Hunger directed by McQueen and Anton Corbijn's Control.

Filmography

Film

Television

Music videos

References

External links 
 
 See-Saw Films website

1979 births
Living people
LGBT film producers
English LGBT entertainers
English film producers
Producers who won the Best Picture Academy Award
Primetime Emmy Award winners
Film people from Bristol
Filmmakers who won the Best Film BAFTA Award
Golden Globe Award-winning producers